Postrer Río is a town in the Independencia province of the Dominican Republic.

Sources 
 – World-Gazetteer.com

Populated places in Independencia Province
Municipalities of the Dominican Republic